Daniel Egbunike (born 25 October 1989) is a British professional boxer.

Amateur career
Egbunike started boxing aged 23 at his local boxing gym for two years before going on to win the ABA Championships. Egbunike won both the novice and elite ABA titles.

Professional career
Egbunike made his professional debut against Alec Bazza on 7 October 2017 at the Brentwood Centre in Essex, scoring a second-round technical knockout (TKO).

On 28 June 2019 he faced fellow unbeaten prospect Martin McDonagh in a Southern Area title eliminator at the York Hall in London. Egbunike won via points decision (PTS) over ten rounds, setting up a shot at the Southern Area title. On 9 November he outpointed the previously-unbeaten Billy Allington over ten rounds at the York Hall, capturing the Southern Area super-lightweight title in the fewest fights to date – winning the title in just his sixth professional bout.

Personal life
Before boxing, Egbunike served time in prison on two occasions for dealing drugs, serving a total of two years and nine months for both offences.

Professional boxing record

References

External links
 

Living people
1989 births
English male boxers
Boxers from Greater London
Light-welterweight boxers